The 2021 Pacific FC season was the third season in the history of Pacific FC, as well as third in the Canadian Premier League. In addition to the domestic league, the club competed in the Canadian Championship.

On December 5, Pacific defeated two-time defending league champions Forge FC 1–0 in the 2021 Canadian Premier League Final to win their first league title. As champions, they qualified for the 2022 CONCACAF League.

Overview 
Coming off of a 4th place finish in the shortened 2020 Canadian Premier League season, Pacific FC was able to retain most of the club's core players, while also bringing in new talent such as international attackers Ollie Bassett and Gianni dos Santos. Expectations were relatively high for the side in Pa-Modou Kah's second year leading the team.

The season began with an eight game bubble tournament in Winnipeg, dubbed "The Kickoff", before the teams moved back to their home stadiums to play out the rest of the season. The first half of the season was a huge success for Pacific, as it saw them at the top of the table and also being the highest-scoring team in the league. In the first round of the Canadian Championship, the Tridents were given a tough draw against fellow British Columbian side Vancouver Whitecaps FC of Major League Soccer, but Pacific managed to defeat them 4-3 at home in front of a sold-out crowd to advance to the next round.

Pacific qualified for the playoffs, by finishing in third place, and face 2nd place team Cavalry FC in the semifinals. They managed to defeat Cavalry 2-1 in extra time, and advanced to the final against defending champions Forge FC. In the final game in Hamilton, midfielder Alessandro Hojabrpour scored the lone goal of the game while goalkeeper Callum Irving kept a clean sheet, and Pacific won their first ever trophy.

Current squad
As of June 10, 2021.

Transfers

In

Draft picks 
Pacific FC selected the following players in the 2021 CPL–U Sports Draft on January 29, 2021. Draft picks are not automatically signed to the team roster. Only those who are signed to a contract will be listed as transfers in.

Out

Loans Out

Competitions

Canadian Premier League

Table

Results by match

Matches

Playoff matches

Canadian Championship

Statistics

Goalkeepers

References

External links 
2021 Pacific FC season at Official Site

2021
2021 Canadian Premier League
Canadian soccer clubs 2021 season